Hemithea is a genus of moths in the family Geometridae erected by Philogène Auguste Joseph Duponchel in 1829. In 1999 there were about 31 species in the genus.

Description
Palpi reaching just beyond the frons in male, long in female. Antennae of male usually ciliated. Hind tibia of male dilated with a fold containing a tuft of long hair. Abdomen with dorsal tufts on three segments. Forewings with vein 3 from angle of cell. Veins 7, 8, 9 and 10 stalked and vein 11 free. Hindwings with angled outer margin at vein 4. Veins 3, 4 and 6, 7 stalked.

Species
 Hemithea aestivaria (Hübner, 1789) – common emerald
 Hemithea antigrapha Prout, 1917
 Hemithea aquamarina Hampson, 1895
 Hemithea insularia Guenée, 1857
 Hemithea krakenaria Holloway, 1996
 Hemithea marina (Butler, 1878)
 Hemithea melalopha Prout, 1931
 Hemithea neptunaria Holloway, 1996
 Hemithea nigriparmata Prout, 1935
 Hemithea notospila Prout, 1917
 Hemithea obscurata (Warren, 1896)
 Hemithea ochrolauta (Warren, 1894)
 Hemithea pellucidula (Turner, 1906)
 Hemithea poseidonaria Holloway, 1996
 Hemithea sequestrata (Prout 1917)
 Hemithea subaurata Warren, 1899
 Hemithea subflavida Warren, 1896
 Hemithea tritonaria (Walker, 1863)
 Hemithea undifera (Walker, 1861)
 Hemithea viridescentaria (Motschulsky, [1861])
 Hemithea wuka (Pagenstecher, 1886)

References

External links
 
 
 

Hemitheini
Taxa named by Philogène Auguste Joseph Duponchel